Siberia Airport ,  is an airport serving the Arauco forest products plant at Cholguán (es), a town in the Bío Bío Region of Chile.

The runway has an additional  of unpaved overrun on the north end.

See also

Transport in Chile
List of airports in Chile

References

External links
OpenStreetMap - Siberia
OurAirports - Siberia
FallingRain - Siberia Airport

Airports in Chile
Airports in Ñuble Region